The Lyons-Knight was an American automobile manufactured from 1913 until 1915 in Indianapolis, Indiana.

History 
Three brothers, James W., William P. and George W. Lyons purchased the Atlas Engine Works and reorganized as the Lyons-Atlas Company.  The previous Atlas Company manufactured two-stroke gasoline and diesel engines, and had developed a line of gasoline engines using the Knight sleeve-valve design.

The Lyons-Knight featured Knight sleeve-valve engines and worm-drive rear axles, that were designed by Harry A. Knox who had previously worked at the Atlas-Knight Automobile Company in Springfield, Massachusetts.

Beginning in 1913, the Lyons-Knight Model K-4 offered a four-cylinder engine that produced 50-hp and was installed in a choice of five or seven passenger touring car, sedan, or berline bodies, using a 130-inch wheelbase.  Prices started at $2,900 for the five passenger touring sedan while the berline sedan was $4,300.

For 1914 a  Model K-6, six-cylinder engine was offered with the same wheelbase in either a five or seven passenger touring sedan for $3,200. In 1915 only the K-4 model was offered but with the addition of limousine and roadster bodies.  Automobile manufacturing ended in 1915 soon after Harry Knox resigned from the company.
Lyons-Atlas Company continued building engines and manufactured Standard marine engines for Britain during World War I.

References

Defunct motor vehicle manufacturers of the United States
Motor vehicle manufacturers based in Indiana
Cars powered by Knight engines
Defunct companies based in Indiana
Brass Era vehicles
1910s cars
Vehicle manufacturing companies established in 1913
Vehicle manufacturing companies disestablished in 1915
Cars introduced in 1913